The Pasar Seni station is an integrated rapid transit station in Kuala Lumpur that is served by the Kelana Jaya Line and the Kajang Line. The station is named after the nearby Central Market (known as Pasar Seni or "Art Market" in Malay) and is located near Petaling Street and the area known as the Chinatown of Kuala Lumpur.

It is made up of two separate stations - the older elevated Kelana Jaya Line station which opened on 1 September 1998 whilst the newer underground Kajang Line station which was opened on 17 July 2017. A pedestrian bridge and escalators link the paid areas of both stations, allowing commuters to conveniently transfer between the Kelana Jaya Line and the Kajang Line, while two unpaid linkways connects the Pasar Seni station directly with the  station, which is served by the KTM Komuter and KTM ETS services.

The station is located next to the Jalan Sultan Mohamed bus hub with buses to Petaling Jaya, Shah Alam and Subang Jaya as well as GOKL buses. Pedestrian bridges also link the station with the Kuala Lumpur General Post Office and the Dayabumi building.

Station features and history

LRT Kelana Jaya Line station
The elevated Pasar Seni LRT station is served by the LRT Kelana Jaya Line, a light rapid transit (LRT) system, and was opened on 1 September 1998 as the terminus of Phase One of what was then known as the PUTRA LRT system began operations. The line would extend to Gombak in 1999 as Phase Two.

The station has two elevated levels; a concourse level and a platform level above it, with an island platform configuration with two platforms.

The station entrance is on the Concourse Level which is accessed via escalators, stairs and lifts from Jalan Tun Tan Cheng Lock and Jalan Sultan Mohamed. Also at the Concourse Level are the fare gates, ticketing machines, Customer Service Counter, convenience store and bakery. The link bridges to the   station, Kuala Lumpur General Post Office and Dayabumi are also at the Concourse Level. A second air-conditioned link bridge to the old Kuala Lumpur station has been added since November 2019.

The ground level of the station is occupied by several bus lanes of the Jalan Sultan Mohamed bus hub. There is also a Rapid Bus Customer Service Office. Covered walkways link the station with the bus hub.

MRT Kajang Line station
The underground mass rapid transit (MRT) station began operations on 17 July 2017 when Phase Two of the MRT Kajang Line was opened.

The station was constructed at the site formerly occupied by the Klang Bus Stand, Plaza Wawasan Complex and the UO Shopping Centre. These three buildings were demolished in 2012 to make way for the MRT station to be constructed.

The station has three underground levels - Concourse Level, Plant Room Level (not accessible to public) and Platform Level - beneath the ground level plaza.

The design of the station entrance buildings at the ground level is based on the quartz found at Bukit Tabur quartz range in Gombak, Selangor, while the theme for the station's interior design is "Confluence", taken from the confluence between the Gombak and Klang Rivers, which is located next to Masjid Jamek, the preceding station on the Kelana Jaya Line. The MRT tunnels in this station is located only 300 meters from the opening of the Kelana Jaya Line's tunnel (towards Masjid Jamek).

LRT-MRT Link
The Pasar Seni LRT and MRT stations are connected by a pedestrian bridge over Jalan Sultan Mohamed. The bridge connects directly to the paid area of the LRT station's Concourse Level. On the MRT station side, escalators, stairs and lifts connect the pedestrian bridge directly to the paid area of the Concourse Level, which is the first underground level of the station.

The paid-to-paid link is labelled as Entrance C of the MRT station. It however only allows commuters to transfer between the LRT and MRT, and does not allow anyone out of the stations.

To accommodate this pedestrian bridge, the LRT station had to undergo some renovation. Besides removing the balustrade at the Concourse Level, the LRT station fare gates were also relocated closer to the entrance. A new service counter was also built replacing the older service counter.

Station layout

Exits and entrances
Pasar Seni station has a total of 4 entrances/exits - Entrance A at Jalan Sultan and Entrance B at Jalan Sultan Mohamed, both belong to the MRT station. Entrance C is the given name for the paid-to-paid pedestrian link bridge between the LRT and MRT stations and is not an entrance from outside. Entrance D at Jalan Tun Tan Cheng Lock and Entrance E at the direct link to the Kuala Lumpur KTM Station are at the LRT station.

Around the station
 HAB Pasar Seni (Hentian Akhir Bandar), City Bus Terminal
 Central Market
 Dayabumi Complex
 Lee Rubber Building
 Petaling Street (Chinatown)
 Victoria Institution first generation building (1894 - 1929)
 KL Guan Di Temple
 Sin Sze Si Ya Temple

Gallery

General

LRT station

MRT station

LRT-MRT link

See also

 Rail transport in Malaysia

References

External links
Kuala Lumpur MRT & LRT Integrations

Kelana Jaya Line
Railway stations opened in 1998
Sungai Buloh-Kajang Line
1998 establishments in Malaysia